Levi Jeremiah Lumeka (born 5 September 1998) is an English professional footballer who plays as a winger for Ligue 1 club Troyes.

Career
Coming through the youth ranks at Crystal Palace, he signed his first professional contract in December 2015. On 10 September 2017, he made his debut as a substitute against Burnley in the Premier League, playing the final 25 minutes of a 1–0 away loss as a substitute for Lee Chung-yong.

On 31 August 2018, Lumeka signed for National League side Leyton Orient on loan until the end of the 2018–19 season. He was recalled from the loan on 9 January 2019 having made only one appearance for Orient, as an added-time replacement for Jobi McAnuff in a 3–0 home win over Solihull Moors on 4 September.

On 20 June 2019, Lumeka joined LigaPro side Varzim S.C. on a two-year deal. He made his debut on 10 August in the first game of the season, a goalless home draw with U.D. Oliveirense in which he replaced Felipe Augusto with 14 minutes left, and scored his first career goal on 30 October to equalise in a 1–1 draw at C.D. Nacional.

On 28 July 2020, Lumeka joined Ligue 2 side Troyes AC on a four-year deal.

On 25 January 2022, Lumeka returned to Portugal to join Vilafranquense on loan until the end of the season.

Personal life
Born in England, Lumeka is of Congolese descent. Lumeka said in August 2020 that he probably wouldn't turn down a call up from DR Congo, but still holds out hope of earning an England call up at some point in the future.

References

External links

1998 births
Living people
People from Beckton
Footballers from the London Borough of Newham
English footballers
English sportspeople of Democratic Republic of the Congo descent
Association football forwards
Crystal Palace F.C. players
Leyton Orient F.C. players
Varzim S.C. players
ES Troyes AC players
Premier League players
National League (English football) players
Liga Portugal 2 players
Ligue 2 players
Black British sportspeople
English expatriate footballers
English expatriate sportspeople in Portugal
Expatriate footballers in Portugal
Expatriate footballers in France
English expatriate sportspeople in France
Championnat National 3 players
Ligue 1 players